The Batak massacre was a massacre of Bulgarians in Batak by Ottoman irregular cavalry troops in 1876 at the beginning of the April Uprising. The estimate for the number of victims ranges from 1,200 to 8,000, depending on the source.

Uprising in Batak 
The role of Batak in the April Uprising was to take possession of the storehouses in the surrounding villages and to ensure that the insurgents would have provisions, also to block the main ways and keep the Turkish soldiers from receiving supplies. The task of Batak was to manage with the Pomak villages (Chepino and Korovo) should those try to prevent the uprising. Should the chetas in the nearby locations fail in their commands, the rest should have gathered in Batak. 
The only problem the organization of the uprising had expected was that Batak had to defend itself alone against the Turkish troops, but the risk was taken. 
After the April uprising started on 30 April 1876, part of the armed men in Batak, led by the voivode Petar Goranov, attacked the Turks. They succeeded to eliminate part of the Ottoman leaders, but were reported to the authorities and 5,000 Bashi-bazouk were sent, mainly Pomaks (Slavic Muslims), led by Ahmet Aga from Barutin which surrounded the town. At that time the Pomaks were a part of the Ottoman Muslim Millet. After a first battle, the men from Batak decided to negotiate with Ahmet Aga. He promised them the withdrawal of his troops under the condition that Batak disarmed. After the rebels had laid down their weapons, the Bashi-bazouk attacked them and beheaded them.

Massacre 
While some of the leaders of the Revolutionary committee were surrendering the weapons, some managed to escape the village, but immediately after that all the territory was surrounded and no one else was let out. The Bashi-Bozouk went to the houses and raided them; many were burnt and they shot at everyone and everything. Many of the people decided to hide into the houses of the wealthy or in the church, which had a stronger construction and was going to protect them from the fire. 
On 2 May, those hidden in the House of Bogdan surrendered, because they were promised by Ahmet Aga to be spared. More than 200 men, women and children were led out, stripped out of their valuables and clothes, in order not to stain them with their blood, and were brutally killed. 
The Aga asked some of the wealthy men of Batak to go to his camp and lay down all the arms of the villagers. Amongst them was the mayor Trendafil Toshev Kerelov and his son, Petar Trandafilov Kerelov. They had reached an agreement that if the village were disarmed, the Pomaks would leave Batak for good. But instead, the Bulgarians were caught captive – once the arms were confiscated, all of them were beheaded, burnt alive or impaled. 
The murder of the leader Trendafil Kerelov was particularly violent and was described by a witness – his son's wife Bosilka:

"My father in law went to meet the Bashi-Bаzouk when the village was surrounded by the men of Ahmet Aga, who said that he wanted all the arms laid down. Trendafil went to collect them from the villagers. When he surrendered the arms, they shot him with a gun and the bullet scratched his eye. Then I heard Ahmet Aga command with his own mouth for Trendafil to be impaled and burnt. The words he used were "Shishak aor" which is Turkish for "to put on a skewer" (as a shish kebab). After that, they took all the money he had, undressed him, gouged his eyes, pulled out his teeth and impaled him slowly on a stake, until it came out of his mouth. Then they roasted him while he was still alive. He lived for half-an-hour during this terrible scene. At the time, I was near Ahmet Aga with other Bulgarian women. We were surrounded by Bashi-Bozouk, who had us surrounded, and forced us to watch what was happening to Trendafil." One of her children, Vladimir, who was still a baby at his mother's breast, was impaled on a sword in front of her eyes. "At the time this was happening, Ahmet Aga's son took my child from my back and cut him to pieces, there in front of me. The burnt bones of Trendafil stood there for one month and only then they were buried".

Januarius MacGahan, a journalist of the New York Herald and the London Daily News wrote of the terrible happenings after his visitation to Batak with Eugene Schuyler. They describe the burned and destroyed city with the stench of the rotting of thousands of piled dismembered corpses and skeletons of the innocent victims including young women, children and unborn babies torn out from the wombs of their pregnant mothers.

Church 
The orthodox church "Sveta Nedelya" was the last keep of the rebels. 
Bashi-bazouk destroyed the school, where 200 people were burnt alive, hidden in the basement. Then they went straight to the church, where they dug holes into the fence of the yard and started to shoot at everyone there. The most terrifying chapter of the massacre happened on the night of 2 May 1876 in that very yard. 
On the morning of 3 May the Pomaks took the yard and advanced to the door of the church, but weren't able to get in – the door was barred by the people inside.
The defense of the church held for three days, the Turkish were shooting ceaselessly at the villagers to make them surrender. Some tried to enter the church from the roof, but were unsuccessful, although they were able to shoot some of the people inside. There was no water in the church, so the barricaded had to resort to the oil of the lamps and the blood of their own dead. They tried to dig into the floor with bare hands in order to find underground water. 
On the third day the survivors decided to go outside, when they realized their fate was decided. When they opened the doors of the church Ahmet Aga was waiting for them with his Bashi-bozouk. A ruthless beheading followed and only those who accepted to be converted to Islam were spared. The plans of the Ottoman leader were to populate the village with the converted villagers, but it turned out that there were not enough of them. Before the Bashi-bozouk left the village, they burnt the church, but the stone walls were preserved and only the wooden furniture and the icons were destroyed. 
When some Russian commissions were to go and inspect the village, 3 months later, the Ottoman authorities tried to bury the bodies, but they could not hide the smell in the air. They also painted the walls of the church, but the blood stains showed up in time.
 
After the massacre in the church, Ahmet Aga summoned all the surviving villagers outside, saying that it would be in order to make a list of the slain and the widows. The better part of the survivors gathered, since those who did not obey would be killed. They were divided in two groups of women and men; then the Ottoman commander made the women stand back and slew all the remaining 300 men. Those women who protested were also raped and killed. On the same day there were another 300 people murdered on the wooden bridge beside the school; first their arms were cut off, then their ears, noses, shoulders, and only after that they were finished.

Batak after the massacre 
According to the most sources, around 5,000 people were massacred in Batak, Perushtitsa and Bratsigovo. The total number of victims in the April uprising according to most estimates around 15,000, which is supported by Eugene Schuyler's report, published in Daily News, according to which at least 15,000 persons were killed during the April Uprising in addition to 36 villages in three districts being burned. According to Donald Quataert around 1,000 Muslims were killed by Christian Bulgarians and consequently 3,700 Christians were killed by Muslims. A contemporary British report mentioned that only 46 Muslim men and no women and children were killed.
In his work "The Bulgarian Massacres Reconsidered"., which has been described as pro-Turkish, the American historian Richard Millman states that Schuyler visited personally only 11 of the villages he reported on. Millman also claims that the accepted reality of the massacres is largely a myth.

Schuyler described the things he saw:
"...On every side were human bones, skulls, ribs, and even complete skeletons, heads of girls still adorned with braids of long hair, bones of children, skeletons still encased in clothing. Here was a house the floor of which was white with the ashes and charred bones of thirty persons burned alive there. Here was the spot where the village notable Trendafil was spitted on a pike and then roasted, and where he is now buried; there was a foul hole full of decomposing bodies; here a mill dam filled with swollen corpses; here the school house, where 200 women and children had taken refuge there were burned alive, and here the church and churchyard, where fully a thousand half-decayed forms were still to be seen, filling the enclosure in a heap several feet high, arms, feet, and heads protruding from the stones which had vainly been thrown there to hide them, and poisoning all the air.

"Since my visit, by orders of the Mutessarif, the Kaimakam of Tatar Bazardjik was sent to Batak, with some lime to aid in the decomposition of the bodies, and to prevent a pestilence.

"Ahmed Aga, who commanded at the massacre, has been decorated and promoted to the rank of Yuz-bashi..."
Another witness to the aftermath of the Massacre is American journalist Januarius MacGahan who described what he saw as follows:
"There was not a roof left, not a whole wall standing; all was a mass of ruins... We looked again at the heap of skulls and skeletons before us, and we observed that they were all small and that the articles of clothing intermingled with them and lying about were all women's apparel. These, then, were all women and girls. From my saddle I counted about a hundred skulls, not including those that were hidden beneath the others in the ghastly heap nor those that were scattered far and wide through the fields. The skulls were nearly all separated from the rest of the bones – the skeletons were nearly all headless. These women had all been beheaded...and the procedure seems to have been, as follows: They would seize a woman, strip her carefully to her chemise, laying aside articles of clothing that were valuable, with any ornaments and jewels she might have about her. Then as many of them as cared would violate her, and the last man would kill her or not as the humour took him....We looked into the church which had been blackened by the burning of the woodwork, but not destroyed, nor even much injured. It was a low building with a low roof, supported by heavy irregular arches, that as we looked in seemed scarcely high enough for a tall man to stand under. What we saw there was too frightful for more than a hasty glance. An immense number of bodies had been partially burnt there and the charred and blackened remains seemed to fill it half way up to the low dark arches and make them lower and darker still, were lying in a state of putrefaction too frightful to look upon. I had never imagined anything so horrible. We all turned away sick and faint, and staggered out of the fearful pest house glad to get into the street again. We walked about the place and saw the same thing repeated over and over a hundred times. Skeletons of men with the clothing and flesh still hanging to and rotting together; skulls of women, with the hair dragging in the dust. bones of children and infants everywhere. Here they show us a house where twenty people were burned alive; there another where a dozen girls had taken refuge, and been slaughtered to the last one, as their bones amply testified. Everywhere horrors upon horrors..."

The British commissioner, Mr. Baring describes the event "as perhaps the most heinous crime that has stained the history of the present century". In October Mr. Baring had to report again on the proceedings of the Turkish commission. After six weeks from the closing of the committee it had not been decided whether or not the Batak Massacre was a crime.

Accusations of revisionism 
In May 2007, a public conference was scheduled in Bulgaria, aiming to present research, held by Martina Baleva and Ulf Brunnbauer, on the formation of national memory for the Batak massacre. Bulgarian media reported that the authors were denying the massacre, which raised substantial media controversy. Finally, the conference was cancelled, and several eminent Bulgarian historians (including Georgi Markov, head of the Institute of History of the Bulgarian Academy of Sciences and Bozhidar Dimitrov, director of the National Museum of History in Sofia) qualified Baleva and Brunnbauer's research as "grandiose falsification". Other historians claimed that the principle of academic freedom is violated.

Before the media controversy beginning
The conference was scheduled to be held in Batak on 18 May 2007 as part of a project entitled "Feindbild Islam – Geschichte und Gegenwart antiislamischer Stereotype in Bulgarien am Beispiel des Mythos vom Massaker in Batak" ("The Image of the Islamic Enemy - the Past and Present of Anti-Islamic stereotypes in Bulgaria as exemplified by the Myth of the Batak Massacre"). The project was led by Ulf Brunnbauer and Martina Baleva from the Institute of Eastern European Studies at the University of Berlin, who were also expected to read papers at the conference.

Reaction in media
Bulgarian media reported that the scientists were denying that a massacre had occurred. There was a public outcry, widespread protests and immediate reactions on the part of the Mayor of Batak, Prime minister Sergei Stanishev, and President Georgi Parvanov. The Bulgarian Academy of Sciences rejected the possibility of providing a place for the conference, stating that there is a huge amount of material proof and documents for the massacres at Batak and Perushtitsa. Ulf Brunnbauer and Martina Baleva apologized and asserted that the outcry was based on a misunderstanding and incorrect information. They stated that their intention had been not to deny the massacre, but to critically look at some paintings and photographs related to it - an issue that Baleva had published an article on a year earlier. They also explained that the term "myth"  in a culturological context does not qualify the veracity of an event, but rather refers to the way it is represented and used as a social construct. Some Bulgarian intellectuals criticized what they said was censorship and an encroachment upon the independence of scholarship and a petition was started in protest against the campaign.

Kaychev-Baleva debate

An important point in Baleva's paper that had been supposed to be read at the conference was that Polish artist Antoni Piotrowski's painting titled "The Batak Massacre" was an important factor for the formation of a national memory of the massacre. Naum Kaychev, assistant professor at Sofia University's Faculty of History, criticized this view in an article seeking to point out certain contradictions and factual errors in Baleva's paper that had been supposed to be read at the cancelled conference. One point of Kaychev's article was to show that national memory of the massacre existed long before Piotrowski's painting - for example, the massacre is described in a school history book in 1881, while Piotrowski's painting only appeared in 1892. In response, Baleva conceded that she had been wrong in claiming that Batak had been entirely forgotten before the painting was created. She nevertheless argued, among other things, that Piotrowski's work did have a significant influence on subsequent national memory of the massacre and on the form of the Batak memorial in particular.

Canonization
On 3 April 2011, Batak massacre victims were canonized as saints, something that had not happened for more than a century.

See also 
Chios massacre
Ottoman Empire
List of massacres in Ottoman Bulgaria

References

External links
The Turkish Atrocities In Bulgaria, The Bronx Times
Баташкото клане не е мит, а реалност. Batak massacre: Provocation Against Bulgarian National History

Massacres in 1876
Massacres in the Ottoman Empire
April Uprising of 1876
Massacres in Bulgaria
Massacres of Christians
1876 in Bulgaria
Anti-Bulgarian sentiment
Persecution of Christians in the Ottoman Empire
Persecution of Eastern Orthodox Christians
Massacres committed by the Ottoman Empire
1876 murders in the Ottoman Empire